Arctoscyphus is a genus of liverworts belonging to the family Solenostomataceae.

The species of this genus are found in southernmost America.

Species:

Arctoscyphus fuegiensis 
Arctoscyphus ronsmithii

References

Jungermanniales
Jungermanniales genera